Maja capensis, the Agulhas spider crab, is a species of crab in the family Majidae.

Distribution
The Agulhas spider crab is known from the west coast of Africa and round the South African coast to Durban in 2–100 m of water.

Description
It has an orange to red carapace covered with short spines and protruding granules, and is often camouflaged with attached animals. It has two double-pointed projections extending between its eyes. The front margins of its carapace are serrated.

References

Majoidea
Crustaceans described in 1894